Corcovado is a mountain in central Rio de Janeiro.

Corcovado may also refer to:

Geography
Argentina
 Corcovado, Chubut, a locality in Argentina
 Corcovado River, a river which originates in Argentina, with its mouth in Chile
Brazil
 Corcovado Rack Railway
Chile
 Corcovado National Park (Chile)
 Corcovado Volcano, a mountain in Chile
 Corcovado River, a river which originates in Argentina, with its mouth in Chile
 Corcovado Gulf
Costa Rica
 Corcovado National Park (Costa Rica)
Puerto Rico
Corcovada, Añasco, Puerto Rico, a barrio in Añasco, a municipality of Puerto Rico (U.S.)

Other
 Corcovado (song), by Antonio Carlos Jobim
 El Corcovado, a literary work by Ermilo Abreu Gómez
 Corcovado (beetle), a genus of longhorn beetles in the family Cerambycidae